Angel Stankov (born 28 May 1953) is a Bulgarian football midfielder and later manager.

He mainly played for Levski Sofia, winning the league and cup in 1979.

References

1953 births
Living people
Bulgarian footballers
OFC Bdin Vidin players
PFC Levski Sofia players
Bulgaria international footballers
Association football midfielders
Bulgarian football managers
PFC Levski Sofia managers